Heinrich Ferdinand Adolph Schönfelder (1875–1966) was a German politician, Alterspräsident (President by right of age, Father of the House) of the Federal German parliamentary council in 1948–49, mayor of Hamburg, and member of the Hamburg Parliament. Schönfelder was member of the Social Democratic Party.

From 1921 to 1925, Schönfelder was the president of the Central Union of Carpenters and Kindred Trades of Germany.

On 1 September 1948 in his position of Alterspräsident, Schönfelder presided over the first meeting of the Parliamentary Council that drafted the Basic Law for the Federal Republic of Germany. As presiding officer of the constitutive meeting of the parliamentary council, he chaired the election of the council's President and two Vice-Presidents. He was chosen first vice-president of the council.

On 23 May 1949, as first vice-president of the parliamentary council, he signed the Basic Law for the Federal Republic of Germany together with Konrad Adenauer and Hermann Schäfer.

Schönfelder was honorary citizen of Hamburg, the highest decoration of the city-state.

See also 
 List of mayors of Hamburg

References

External links 
 
 

1875 births
1966 deaths
Mayors of Hamburg
Senators of Hamburg
Social Democratic Party of Germany politicians